William Gardner (7 June 1893 – 1973), also known as Wally Gardner, was an English professional footballer who played as an inside forward or a centre forward in the Football League for Derby County, Queens Park Rangers, Ashington, Grimsby Town, Darlington, Torquay United, York City, Crewe Alexandra and Rochdale and in non-League football for Bishop Auckland and Spennymoor United. He was capped by the England national amateur team, scoring two goals in five matches in 1920.

References

1893 births
1973 deaths
Date of death missing
Place of death missing
Footballers from County Durham
English footballers
England amateur international footballers
Association football forwards
Durham City A.F.C. players
Crook Town A.F.C. players
Bishop Auckland F.C. players
Derby County F.C. players
Spennymoor United F.C. players
Queens Park Rangers F.C. players
Ashington A.F.C. players
Grimsby Town F.C. players
Darlington F.C. players
Torquay United F.C. players
York City F.C. players
Crewe Alexandra F.C. players
Rochdale A.F.C. players
English Football League players